This is a list of programmes broadcast by Channel 4 that have Wikipedia articles. Channel 4 is one of the five major terrestrial television channels in the United Kingdom.
The dates shown are for the programme's original broadcast.

Animation

A Grand Day Out(Aardman Animations; on C4 1990)
Angry Kid (Aardman Animations; on C4 1998–2002)
The Bear(1998)
Beavis and Butt-Head(US import; on C4 1994–1999)
Bob and Margaret (1998-2001)
Bromwell High (2006-2008)
Clone High (US/Canada import; on C4 2003)
Crapston Villas (1995-1998)
Creature Comforts (short film that was part of the Lip Synch series in 1989)
Deadsville (2006)
Dick Spanner, P.I. (1986-1987)
 Don't Hug Me I'm Scared (Sep 2022-)
Duncanville (US import; on C4 2020–)
Empire Square (2004-2006)
Family Guy (US import; on C4 1999–2005)
Famous Fred (1996)
Father Christmas (1991)
Four-Mations (animation programming block; 1990–1998)
Full English (2012)
Futurama (US import, on C4 1999–2007)
Going Equipped  (short film that was part of the Lip Synch series in 1990)
Granpa (1989)
House of Rock (2000-2002) 
Ivor the Invisible (2001)
King of the Hill (US import; on C4 1997–2010)
Lip Synch (1989-1990)
MAD  (US import)
Next (short film that was part of the Lip Synch series in 1990)
Olive, the Other Reindeer  (US import)
The PJs (US import)
Pond Life (1996, 2000)
Prep & Landing (US import)
Prep & Landing: Naughty vs. Nice (US import)
The Ricky Gervais Show (animated comedy; 2010–2012)
Rick and Morty (US import; 2019 – present)
The Simpsons (US import; on C4 2004 – present)
The Snowman (1982)
The Snowman and the Snowdog (2012)
Soul Music (1998)
South Park (US import; on C4 1998–2006)
The Tiger Who Came to Tea (2019) 
Top Cat (US import, listed as "Boss Cat")
War Story (short film that was part of the Lip Synch series in 1990) 
We're Going on a Bear Hunt (2016)
Wowser (Japan import) 
Wyrd Sisters (1997)

Breakfast
The Big Breakfast (1992–2002, 2022–present)
The Channel Four Daily (1989–1992)
Freshly Squeezed  (2006-2012)
Morning Glory (2006)
RI:SE (2002–2003)

Children's

2 Stupid Dogs (US import)
Aaahh!!! Real Monsters
The Adventures of Batman
The Adventures of the Little Prince  (Japan import)
Adventures of Sonic the Hedgehog (US/Italy/Spain import)
The Adventures of Super Mario Bros. 3 (US/Italy/Canada import)
The Adventures of T-Rex (Japan and US import)
The Adventures of Tintin (Canada/France import)
Alfred J. Kwak (Netherlands/Germany/Japan import)
Angela Anaconda (US/Canada import)
Babar
Baby Huey
Back to the Future
Bagpuss
The Banana Splits
Barbapapa
Biker Mice from Mars (US import; on C4 1993–1996)
The Bluffers
Bobobobs (Spain import)
The Bored Witch (Spain import)
Bug Alert (series 1 & 2 originally broadcast on GMTV; series 3 produced for C4)
Camberwick Green (originally broadcast on BBC; on C4 1994–2000)
The Care Bears Family
CatDog (US import; on C4 1999–2007)
Clangers
Cubeez (originally broadcast on ITV; on C4 2005–2006)
Danger Mouse (originally broadcast on ITV 1981–1992)
Dennis (US import)
Deputy Dawg
Dig & Dug with Daisy (1994)
Dog City (1992-1994)
Donkey Kong Country
Double Act (TV film; 2002)
Doug
Droopy
Dumb and Dumber (US import)
Earthworm Jim (US import)
Eureeka's Castle
The Ferals
Flash Gordon (animation; US/Canada/France import)
Foofur
Fourways Farm (1993-1996)
Free Willy (US/Canada import)
The Get Along Gang (France/US import; originally broadcast on ITV)
Gophers! (1988-1990)
Grim Tales (originally broadcast on ITV)
Hammerman
Heathcliff (France/Canada/US import)
Hector Heathcote
Helping Henry (educational; 1988)
The Herbs
Herman and Katnip
Home to Rent (France import: Series 1 on C4 1998)
Hong Kong Phooey
The Hoobs (2001-2014)
Insektors (1994-1995)
Inspector Gadget
The Investigators (educational; 1999-)
Ivor the Engine
Iznogoud
Jayce and the Wheeled Warriors (France/Canada import)
Johnny Bravo
Junior Bake Off (2019-)
Katie and Orbie (Canada import)
Kaput and Zösky (France/Canada import)
The Kids from Room 402
Kid 'n Play
King Arthur and the Knights of Justice
The KNTV Show (educational; 2006–2008)
la linea (Italy import)
Laurel and Hardy (animation; US import)
The Legend of White Fang (Canada import)
The Little Lulu Show
Lift Off
Little Dracula (US import)
Little Rosie
Little Shop
Looney Tunes (US import)
Madeline 
The Magic Roundabout (redubbed; 1992–1993)
The Magic School Bus
M.A.S.K. (1990)
Mio Mao (2007)
Monster Maker (US import)
Monster Tails  (US import)
Mr Men (originally broadcast on BBC 1974–1978)
The Muppets Celebrate Jim Henson (US import)
Murun Buchstansangur (1982-1989)
Noggin the Nog
Ovide and the Gang
Paddington (originally broadcast on BBC)
Pat & Mat
Pelswick (2002-2004)
The Pink Panther
Pinwheel (US import)
Pippi Longstocking
Pob's Programme (1985-1990)
Popeye 
ProStars
Rocko's Modern Life
Rocky Hollow
Roobarb
Saber Rider and the Star Sheriffs
Sali Mali (originally broadcast on S4C)
Salty's Lighthouse
Saved by the Bell (US import)
The Secret World of Alex Mack
Sesame Street (US import; on C4 1987–2001)
Sharky & George (US import)
Sonic SatAM
Sonic Underground
Spider-Man (US import)
Spiff and Hercules (France import; on C4 1993)
Square Pegs (US import; on C4 1983-)
The Storyteller
Street Sharks
Stunt Dawgs
Super Dave: Daredevil for Hire (US/Italy import)
Super Mario World (US/Italy/Canada import)
Tales of the Riverbank (1995-1998)
TerryToons
Totally Spies (France and Canada import)
Towser
The Trap Door (originally broadcast on ITV; on C4 1996–2004)
The Treacle People (originally broadcast on CITV)
Trumpton
Ulysses 31 (France/Japan import)
The Untouchables of Elliot Mouse (Spain import) 
Victor and Maria
Voltron: Defender Of The Universe
Where on Earth Is Carmen Sandiego?
Wise Up (educational; 1995–2000)
Wish Kid (US/Italy import)
The Wonderful Wizard of Oz (Japan import)
Worzel Gummidge Down Under (1987-1989)
The Zack Files

Comedy

3rd Rock from the Sun (US import)
8 Out of 10 Cats (2005-)
8 Out of 10 Cats Does Countdown (2012-)
10 O'Clock Live (2011-2013)
The 11 O'Clock Show (1998-2000)
18 Stone of Idiot (2005)
A Comedy Roast (2010-2011) 
A Fine Romance (originally broadcast on ITV; on C4 1983)
A Stab in the Dark (1992)
The Abbott and Costello Show (US import; on C4 1982-)
Absolutely (1989-1993)
According to Jim (US import)
The Adam and Joe Show (1996-2001)
The Addams Family (US import; on C4 1983–)
Anna & Katy (pilot 2011; series 2013)
Archie Bunker's Place  (US import; on C4 1983)
The Armando Iannucci Shows (2001)
Armstrong and Miller (1997-2001)
Back (2017-)
Bad News Tour (1983; part of The Comic Strip Presents...)
Bad Sugar (2012)
Ballot Monkeys (2015)
Balls of Steel (2005-2008)
Ban This Filth (2004)
Banzai (2001-2003)
Barking (1998)
Best of the Worst (2006)
Bewitched (US import)
The Big Bang Theory (US import)
The Big Fat Quiz of the Year (2004-)
Black Books (2000-2004)
Black-ish (US import)
Blue Heaven (pilot 1992; series 1994)
Blunder (2006)
Bo' Selecta! (2002-2009)
Borat's Television Programme (2004)
Boyz Unlimited (1999)
Brass (third series 1990; the first two series were originally broadcast on ITV 1983–1984)
Brass Eye (1997; 2001)
Bremner, Bird and Fortune (1999-2010)
Bring Back... (2005-2009) 
Britain's Got the Pop Factor... and Possibly a New Celebrity Jesus Christ Soapstar Superstar Strictly on Ice (2008)
British Comedy Awards (2011-2014)
The Bronx Bunny Show (2003)
Buffalo Bill  (US import) 
The Bullshitters: Roll Out the Gunbarrel (1984)
Campus (pilot 2009; series 2011)
Capstick Capers (1983)
Captain Butler (1997)
Car 54, Where Are You? (US import; on C4 1983-)
Cardinal Burns (2012-2014)
Caroline in the City  (US import)
Catastrophe (2015-2019)
Chance in a Million (1984-1986)
Channel 4's Comedy Gala (2010-2016)
Cheers (US import; on C4 1983-)
Chelmsford 123 (1988-1990)
Chivalry (2022)
Chris Moyles' Quiz Night (2009-2012)
Comedy Lab (1998-2011)
Comedy Showcase (2007-2012)
Comedy World Cup (2012) 
The Comic Strip Presents (1982–1988, 1998, 2000, 2005, 2011)
The Cosby Show (US import)
Cows (1997)
The Curse (2022)
Cybill (US import)
Da Ali G Show (2000-2003)
Damned (2016-2018)
Desmond's (1989-1994)
Derry Girls (2018-2022)
The Dick Van Dyke Show (US import; on C4 1983)
Didn't You Kill My Brother? (1988; part of The Comic Strip Presents...)
Dogface (originally broadcast on E4; 2007) 
Don't Hug Me I'm Scared (2022-)
Dream Stuffing (1984)
Dressing for Breakfast (1995-1998)
Drop the Dead Donkey (1990-1998)
Eat the Rich (C4 film; 1987)
Ellen (US import)
The Estate Agents (2002)
Everybody Loves Raymond (US import)
Everyone Else Burns (2023)
Facejacker (2010-2012)
Fairly Secret Army (1984-1986)
FAQ U (2005) 
Father Ted (1995-1998)
Feeling Nuts Comedy Night (comedy and health awareness; 2014)
Five Go Mad in Dorset (1982; part of The Comic Strip Presents...)
Flipside (2004)
Flowers (2016-2018)
Fonejacker (2008)
Frank of Ireland (2021)
Frankie Boyle's Tramadol Nights (2010)
Frasier (US import)
Free Agents (2009)
Friday Night Dinner (2011-2020)
Friday Night Live (1988, comedy and music)
Friends (US import)
GameFace (pilot 2014; series 2017-)
Garth Marenghi's Darkplace (2004)
Gash (2003)
Geraldine: The Winner's Story (2008)
Get Smart (US import; on C4 1983–)
The Golden Girls (US import)
Green Wing (2004-2007)
Gunston's Australia (Australia import)
Hang Ups (2018)
Happy Endings (US import)
Harry Hill (1997-2000)
Here's Lucy(US import; on C4 1983)
Heroes of Comedy (1995-2003)
Hit the Road Jack (2012)
Home Improvement (US import)
The Horne Section TV Show (2022)
Hullraisers (2022)
The Hunt for Tony Blair (2011; part of The Comic Strip Presents...)
Hung Out (2010)
I Dream of Jeannie (US import)
I Love Lucy (US import; on C4 1982–)
I'm Spazticus (2012-2013)
The Inbetweeners (originally broadcast on E4)
In Exile (1998)
Is it Legal? (Series 3; 1998)
The IT Crowd (2006-2010; 2013)
It Takes a Worried Man (1983; series 1 & 2 originally broadcast on ITV, series 3 produced for C4)
Jack and Jeremy's Real Lives (1996)
Jam (2000) 
Jo Brand Through the Cakehole (1993-1996)
Just Shoot Me! (US import)
The Kevin Bishop Show (2008-2009)
King Of... (2011) 
The King of Queens (US import)
Kookyville (2012)
The Lady is a Tramp (1983-1984)
Law of the Playground (2006-2008)
Lee and Dean (2018-2019)
Let The Blood Run Free (import)
Little Armadillos (1984)
Living Apart Together (C4 film; on C4 1983) 
London Irish (2013)
Los Dos Bros (pilot 1999; series 2001)
Lovesick (formerly known as Scrotal Recall; series 1 on C4 2014, series 2 & 3 on Netflix)
The Mad Bad Ad Show (2012)
Man Down (2013-2017)
Man to Man with Dean Learner (2006)
Mann's Best Friends (1985)
The Mary Tyler Moore Show (US import)
The Mark Thomas Product (1996-2003)
Mash and Peas (1996-1997)
Max and Paddy's Road to Nowhere (2004)
Meet the Magoons (2005)
Mike & Molly (US import)
The Mimic (2013-2014)
Modern Toss (pilot 2005; series 2006–2008)
Moesha (import)
More Bad News (1988; part of The Comic Strip Presents...)
The Morgana Show (2010)
Mr Don & Mr George (1993)
Mr. Jolly Lives Next Door (1988; part of The Comic Strip Presents... it had a limited theatrical release in 1987) 
The Munsters (US import; on C4 1982–)
My Funniest Year (2010-2011) 
My Name Is Earl (US import)
My New Best Friend (2003)
Nathan Barley (2005)
Never Mind the Horrocks (1996)
New Hero of Comedy (2008)
Nightingales (1990-1993)
No Problem! (1983-1985)
Norbert Smith: A Life (1989)
The Norman Gunston Show (Australia import; on C4 1982–)
On the Razzle (1983)
The Optimist (1983-1985)
Packet of Three (1991-1992; series 2 was titled Packing 'Em In)
Paddy's TV Guide (2013)
Paris (1994)
The Paul Hogan Show (Australian import; on C4 1982–)
Paul Merton: The Series (1991-1993)
The People's Book of Records (2003)
Peep Show (2003-2015)
Penelope Princess of Pets (2010)
Perfect Couples (US import)
Perfect Night In (2007)
Pete versus Life (2010-2011)
Pets (2001-2002)
PhoneShop (2009-2013)
Phoenix Nights (2001-2002)
Plus One (2009)
Porkpie (1995-1996)
Porterhouse Blue (1987)
Power Monkeys (2016)
Prince Andrew: The Musical (2022)
Prospects (1986)
Raised by Wolves (pilot 2013; series 2015–2016)
Relative Strangers (1985-1987)
Robert's Web (2010) 
Roseanne (US import)
Russell Brand's Ponderland (2007)
Saturday Live (1985-1988; comedy and music)
Sean's Show (1992-1993)
The Secret Policeman's Ball (2006) 
The Secret Policeman's Ball 2008 
The Secret Policeman's Ball 2012
Set of Six (1990)
Sex and the City (US import)
Sirens (2011)
Smack the Pony (1999-2003)
Small Potatoes (1999-2001)
Soap (US import; on C4 1983-)
Space Cadets (1997)
Spaced (1999-2001)
Spoons (2005)
Stand Up for the Week (2010-2013)
Star Stories (2006-2008)
Stath Lets Flats (2018-)
Sticky Moments (1989-1990, satirical game show)
The Strike (1988; part of The Comic Strip Presents...)
Superfrank! (1987) 
The Supergrass (1988; Film4 production originally released in 1985)
Takeover TV (1995-1996)
Tandoori Nights (1985-1987)
Taskmaster (2020-)
Terry and Julian (1992)
That Peter Kay Thing (2000)
They Came from Somewhere Else (1984)
This is David Lander (1988-1990)
This Way Up (2019-)
The Three Stooges (US import)
Toast of London (pilot 2012; series 2013–2015)
Tonightly (2008)
Trigger Happy TV (2000-2003; 2016–2017)
TV Offal (1997-1998)
Ugly Betty (US import)
Very British Problems (2015-2016)
Very Important People (2012) 
Vic Reeves Big Night Out (1990-1991)
Vids (1999-2001)
Was It Something I Said? (2013)
Wayne and Shuster (Canada import; on C4 1983–)
We Are Lady Parts (pilot 2018; series 2021)
The Weekenders (1992)
Who Dares Wins (1983-1988)
Whose Line Is It Anyway? (1988-1999)
Whose Line Is It Anyway? (US import)
Will & Grace (US import)
WKRP in Cincinnati (US import; on C4 1983)
The Windsors (2016-)
Wood and Walters (originally broadcast on ITV; on C4 1983)
The World of Lee Evans (1995)
Xerxes (Sweden import)
Year of the Rabbit (2019)
The Yob (1988; part of The Comic Strip Presents...)
You Have Been Watching (2009-2010)
The Young Person's Guide to Becoming a Rock Star (1998)

Drama

90210 (US import)
A Dance to the Music of Time (1997)
A Harlot's Progress (TV film; 2006)
A Running Jump (short film; 2012)
A Sense of Freedom (originally broadcast on ITV as part of ITV Playhouse; on C4 1983)
A Very British Coup (1988)
A Woman of Substance (1985)
The Accident (2019)
Adult Material (2020)
Alfred Hitchcock Presents (US import; on C4 1983–)
Alice Through the Looking Glass (TV film; 1998)
Andromeda (US import)
Angel (C4 film; on C4 1983)
Anna Karenina (2000)
Anne of Green Gables: The Sequel (1987)
Another Bouquet (originally broadcast on ITV; on C4 1983)
Any Human Heart (2010)
Arctic Circle (Finland-German import; on C4 2022)
The Avengers (originally broadcast on ITV; on C4 1982-)
Baghdad Central (2020)
Behaving Badly (1989)
The Best Little Girl in the World (US import; 1981 TV film on C4 1983)
Black Mirror (2011-2014)
Blade on the Feather (originally broadcast on ITV as part of ITV Playhouse; on C4 1983)
Boris Karloff Presents (US import; on C4 1983)
Born to Kill (2017)
Bouquet of Barbed Wire (originally broadcast on ITV; on C4 1983)
Boy A (TV film; 2007)
Brideshead Revisited (originally broadcast on ITV; on C4 1983)
Britz (2007)
Brond (1987)
Brothers & Sisters (US import)
Buried (2003)
Camelot (US import)
The Camomile Lawn (1992)
The Cane Field Killings (South African import; on C4 2022) 
Cape Wrath (also known as Meadowlands; 2007)
Centrepoint (1990)
Charmed (US import)
Chimerica (2019)
City of Vice (2008)
City Sugar (originally broadcast on ITV as part of ITV Playhouse; on C4 1983)
Clapham Junction (TV film; 2007)
Close to Me (2021)
Closing Numbers (C4 film; 1993)
Coalition (TV film; 2015)
Cold Lazarus (co-production with BBC; 1996)
The Comedian(US import that was part of Playhouse 90; on C4 1983–)
Comics (1993)
Coming Up (2003-2013)
Complicit (TV film; 2013)
Consent (2023)
The Courtroom (2004) 
Cream in My Coffee (originally broadcast on ITV as part of ITV Playhouse; on C4 1983)
Cucumber (2015)
Dates (2013)
The Day Christ Died (US import; TV film on C4 1983)
Day To Remember (TV play; 1986)
Deadwater Fell (2020)
The Deal (TV film; 2003)
Deceit (2021)
The Devil's Whore (aka The Devil's Mistress in the US; 2008)
Dockers (TV film; 1999)
Dubplate Drama (2005-2009)
Edwin (1984)
Electric Dreams (2017-2018)
Elizabeth I (2005)
England, My England (C4 film; 1995)
ER (US import)
Escape from Iran: The Canadian Caper  (Canada/US import; TV film on C4 1983)
Eurocops (pan-European co-production; 1988-1993)
Experience Preferred... But Not Essential (TV film; 1982)
The Execution of Gary Glitter (2009)
Fallen Angel (US import; TV movie on C4 1983)
Fallout (TV film; 2008)
The Fear (2012)
The First (2018)
First, You Cry (US import; TV movie on C4 1983)
The Fool (Film Four production; 1990)
Forever Young (TV film; 1983)
The Fragile Heart (1996)
G.B.H. (1991)
The Gamekeeper (originally broadcast on ITV; on C4 1983)
The Ghost Squad (2005)
Giro City (C4 film 1982; also known as And Nothing But The Truth)
God Rot Tunbridge Wells! (C4 film; 1985)
Goldplated (2006)
Good and Bad at Games (C4 film; 1983)
The Good Wife (US import)
Gossip from the Forest (originally broadcast on ITV as part of ITV Playhouse; on C4 1983)
Griffin and Phoenix (US import; TV movie on C4 1983)
The Handmaid's Tale (US import)
Hearts and Minds (1995)
Help (TV film; 2021)
Hero (C4 film; 1982) 
Hold the Dream (1986)
Homeland (US import)
Honour, Profit and Pleasure (TV film; 1985)
The House on Garibaldi Street (US 1979 TV film: on C4 1983)
Humans (2015-2018)
I Am... (anthology; 2019-)
Ike (US import; on C4 1983)
Indian Summers (2015-2016)
Innocents (TV film; 2000)
It's a Sin (2021)
Jack London's Tales of the Klondike  (Canada import; on C4 1983)
Karaoke (co-production with BBC; 1996)
Killer Net (1998)
Kiri (2018)
Kiss Me First (2018)
Labyrinth (German/South Africa import; on C4 2012)
L.A. Law (US import)
The Last Dragon (2005)
Last Rights (2005)
Laurence Olivier Presents King Lear (1983)
The Life and Adventures of Nicholas Nickleby (1982)
The Light in the Hall (2023)
Lipstick on Your Collar (1993)
Little Gloria... Happy at Last (US import; on C4 1983)
Little Napoleons (1994)
Lock, Stock... (2000)
London's Burning (2011)
The Lone Ranger (US import)
The Long Summer of George Adams (US import; TV film on C4 1983)
Longford (TV film; 2006)
Longitude (2000)
Lost (US import)
Low Winter Sun (2006)
Malu Mulher (Brazil import)
The Manageress (1989-1990)
The Mark of Cain (TV film; 2007)
Marty (US import; part of The Philco Television Playhouse)
Max Headroom: 20 Minutes into the Future (1985)
Melissa (1997)
The Mill (2013-2014)
Moonlighting (C4 film; on C4 1983)
More Tales of the City (1998)
Mosley (1998)
Naked City (US import; on C4 1983)
Nashville (US import)
National Treasure (2016)
Nelly's Version (C4 film; on C4 1983)
Never Never (2006)
New Worlds (2014)
Nip/Tuck (US import)
Nine Perfect Strangers (US import; on C4 2022)
No Offence (2015-2018)
North Square (2000)
Not Only But Always (TV film; 2004)
NY-LON (2004) 
The O.C. (US import)
One Summer (1983)
One Tree Hill (US import)
The Orchid House (1991)
Out (originally broadcast on ITV; on C4 1983)
Outlier (Norway import; on C4 2022)
Oz (US import)
P'tang, Yang, Kipperbang (TV film; 1982)
Pleasureland (TV film; 2003)
The Politician's Wife (1995)
The Pride of Jesse Hallam (US import; TV movie on C4 1983)
The Promise (2011) 
Psychos (1999)
The Queen (2009)
The Queen's Sister (TV film; 2005)
Queer as Folk (1999-2000)
Rain on the Roof (originally broadcast on ITV as part of ITV Playhouse; on C4 1983)
Red Riding (2009)
The Relief of Belsen (TV film; 2007)
Remembrance (C4 film; 1982)
Rocks (Film4 production; on C4 2022)
Run (2013)
The Secret Life of Us (Australia import)
Secret Orchards (originally broadcast on ITV as part of ITV Playhouse; on C4 1983)
Secret State (2012)
Sex Traffic (2004)
Shackleton (2002)
The Short and Curlies (TV short film; 1987)
Smallville (US import)
Somewhere Boy (2022)
Southcliffe (2013)
Southland (US import)
St. Elsewhere (US import; on C4 1983-)
Stargate SG-1 (US import)
Star Trek: Enterprise (US import; 2002–2005)
Sugar Rush (2005-2006)
Sunday (TV film; 2002)
Suspect  (2022)
Sword of Honour (TV film broadcast in 2 parts; 2001)
The Taking of Prince Harry (2010)
Tales of the City (1993)
This Is England '86 (2010)
This Is England '88 (2011)
This Is England '90 (2015)
Tickets for the Titanic (1987-1988)
Top Boy (2011-2013)
Traffik (1989)
Traitors (2019)
The Trial: A Murder in the Family (2017)
Tusitala (1986)
UKIP: The First 100 Days (2015)
Ultraviolet (1998)
The Undeclared War (2022)
The Unloved (TV film; 2009)
Upstairs, Downstairs (originally broadcast on ITV; on C4 1982-)
Utopia (2013-2014)
 Vardy v Rooney: A Courtroom Drama (2022)
The Virtues (2019)
Walter (TV film; 1982)
Walter and June (TV film; 1983)
White Teeth (2012)
Without a Trace (US import)
Word of Honour (US import; TV film on C4 1983)
The World Cup: A Captain's Tale (originally broadcast on ITV as part of ITV Playhouse; on C4 1983)
The Year of the French (1983)
Zastrozzi, A Romance (1986)

Dramedy

Ackley Bridge (2017-2022)
Ally McBeal (US import)
As If (2001-2004)
Babylon (2014)
The Big One (1992)
The Bisexual (2018)
The Book Group (2002-2003)
Cast Offs (2009) 
Confessions of Felix Krull: Confidence Man (Austria/France/West Germany import; on C4 1983)
Crashing (2016)
Dead Set (2009; originally broadcast on E4 in 2008)
Derek (pilot 2012; series 2013–2014)
Desperate Housewives (US import)
The Draughtsman's Contract (C4 film; on C4 1983)
Ed (US import)
The End of the F***ing World (2017-2019)
The Favourite (Film4 production; on C4 2022) 
Feel Good (2020-2021)
Fresh Meat (2011-2016)
Glee (US import)
The Great (first broadcast on Hulu; on C4 2021-)
Home (2019-2020)
The Irish R.M. (1983-1985)
Loaded (2017)
Mapp & Lucia (1985-1986) 
Meantime (TV film; 1983)
Metrosexuality (2001)
No Angels (2004-2006)
Not Safe for Work (2015)
The Personal History of David Copperfield (Film4 Production; on C4 2022)
Pure (2019)
Ramy (US import; on C4 2021-)
Red Monarch (TV film; 1983)
Screw (2022)
Scully (1984)
Shameless (2004-2013)
Teenage Health Freak (1991-1993)
Teachers (2001-2004)
Totally Frank (2005-2006)
Wedding Belles (TV film; 2007)
Wittgenstein (C4 film; 1993)
The Wonder Years (import)

Food

The F Word (2005-2010)
Food Unwrapped (2012-)
Gok Cooks Chinese (2012)
Gordon Ramsay: Uncharted (US import; 2021)
Gordon Ramsay: Cookalong Live (2008, 2011, 2012)
Gordon Ramsay's Home Cooking (2013)
Gordon Ramsay's Ultimate Cookery Course (2012)
Gordon's Great Escape (2010-2011)
Heston's Fantastical Food (2012) 
Heston's Feasts (2009-2010, special 2011) 
Jamie & Jimmy's Friday Night Feast (2014-)
Jamie at Home (2007-2008)
Jamie's 15-Minute Meals (2012)
Jamie's 30-Minute Meals (2010)
Jamie's Comfort Food (2014)
Jamie Does... (2010)
Jamie's Kitchen (2002)
Jamie's Meat-Free Meals (2019)
Jamie's Quick & Easy Food (2017-2020)
Jamie's School Dinners (2005)
Jamie's Super Food (2014)
Nigella Bites (1999-2001)
River Cottage: Gone Fishing (2007)
Snackmasters (2019-)

Game shows

The £100K Drop (formally known as The Million Pound Drop; 2010–2015, 2018–2019)
1001 Things You Should Know (2012-2013)
Alan Carr's Celebrity Ding Dong (2008)
Back in the Day (2005)
Baggage (2012)
The Bank Job (2012) 
Benchmark (2015)
Beat the Chef (2019)
Celebrity Fifteen to One (1990-2015)
Cheap Cheap Cheap (2017) 
Codex (2006-2007)
The Common Denominator (2013)
Countdown (C4's first broadcast programme; 1982-)
The Crystal Maze (1990-1995, 2016, 2017–2020)
Deal or No Deal (2005-2016)
Distraction (2003-2004)
Don't Quote Me (1990)
Draw It! (2014)
Face the Clock (2013)
Five Minutes to a Fortune (2013)
Fifteen to One (1988-2003, 2014–2019)
Full Metal Challenge (2003)
GamesMaster (1992-1998)
I Literally Just Told You (2021-)
Jeopardy (1983-1984)
Last Chance Lottery (1997)
Love in the Afternoon (1995-1996) 
Moneybags (2021)
Naked Attraction (2016-)
Naked Elvis (1999)
Password (1982-1983)
Perfect Match (2001-2003)
The Question Jury (2016-2017)
Scrapheap Challenge (1998-2010)
The Search (2007)
Superstar Dogs: Countdown to Crufts (2014)
Tell the Truth (1983-1985)
Treasure Hunt (1982-1989)
That'll Test 'Em (2006)
Unanimous (2006)
Wanted (1996-1997)
Watercolour Challenge (1998-2001)
Where in the World (1983-1985)
Win It, Cook It (2014)
Win My Wage (2007) 
Without Prejudice? (2003-2004)
Wogan's Perfect Recall (2008-2010) 
X-Fire (2001-2002)
Your Face or Mine? (2002-2003; originally broadcast on E4)

Light entertainment, chat shows and illusion

100 Greatest (1999-2015)
The 5 O'Clock Show (2010)
50 Greatest Magic Tricks (2002)
Alan Carr: Chatty Man (2009-2016; Xmas special in 2017)
Alan Carr's Happy Hour (2016)
Alan Carr's Specstacular (2011-2017)
An Audience with... (1983-1990)
Baadasss TV (1994-1996)
The Big Narstie Show (2018-)
Bits (1999-2001)
The Charlotte Church Show (2006-2008)
Comic's Choice (2011) 
The Courtney Act Show (2018) 
Daily Brunch with Ocado (2014-2015)
Derren Brown: The Events (2009) 
Don't Forget Your Toothbrush (1994-1995)
Elephant Parts (US import; on C4 1983)
Eurotrash (1993-2004, 2016)
Everybody Loves Lil' Chris (2008) 
Experimental (2015) 
Fern (2011) 
The Friday Night Project (2005-2008)
Frock Me (2008-2010) 
Get Knighted (1983)
The Girlie Show (1996-1997)
The Heist (2006) 
How to Be a Psychic Spy (2009)
How to Control the Nation (2009)
How to Take Down a Casino (also known as How to Beat a Casino, and How to Beat the Casino; 2009)
Kazuko's Karaoke Klub (1988-1989)
Kylie's Secret Night (2019)
The Last Leg (2012-)
The Last Resort with Jonathan Ross (1987-1988, 1997)
The Lateish Show with Mo Gilligan (2019-)
Light Lunch (1997-1999)
Loose Talk (1983)
Meet Ricky Gervais (2000)
Messiah (2005)
Moviewatch (1993-1998)
The Oprah Winfrey Show (US import)
The Paul O'Grady Show (2006-2009)
Penn & Teller's Magic and Mystery Tour (2003)
Pocket TV (originally broadcast on YouTube)
The Real Football Fan Show (2018-)
Richard & Judy (2001-2008)
The Richard Blackwood Show (1999-2001)
Rude Tube (2008-2015)
The Russell Brand Show (2006)
Saturday Zoo (1993)
The Secret Cabaret (1990-1992)
So Graham Norton (1998-2002)
Steph's Packed Lunch (2020-) 
Sunday Brunch (2012-)
The Sunday Night Project (2008-2009)
TFI Friday (1996-2000, 2015)
Thumb Bandits (2001-2002)
Top Ten (1995-2002)
Trick or Treat (2007-2008)
TV Heaven, Telly Hell (2006-2007)
The Unpleasant World of Penn & Teller (1994)
V Graham Norton (2002-2003)
Viva Cabaret (1993-1994)

Music

A Carnegie Hall Christmas Concert (US import)
American Bandstand's 30th Anniversary Special (US import; on C4 1983)
B4 (2004-2008)
Being... N-Dubz (2010-2011; documentary)
Big World Cafe (1989)
The Chart Show (1986-1989, 2003)
ECT (1985) 
Four to the Floor (2014-2015)
Gastank (1982-1983)
Girls Aloud: Off the Record (2006; reality series originally broadcast on E4)
The Hip Hop Years (documentary; 1999)
Hit40UK
Karaoke Fishtank (2000-2001)
Kylie's Golden Tour (2019)
Live from Abbey Road (2007-2012) 
The Max Headroom Show (1985-1987)
MOBO Awards (1998-2003)
Music of the Millennium (1999)
Network 7 (also current affairs; 1987–1988)
The Nokia Green Room (2008-)
Orange unsignedAct  (2007-2009; originally named MobileAct unsigned) 
Popworld (2001-2007)
Rock School (2005-2006)
The Singer Takes It All (2014) 
Smash Hits Poll Winners Party (2001-2005)
T4 on the Beach (2003-2012)
Top C's and Tiaras (1982-1983)
Transmission (2006-2007)
The Tube (1982-1987)
UK Music Hall of Fame (2004-2006)
The Word (1990-1995)

News, documentaries and current affairs

9/11 102 Minutes That Changed America (US import)
100% English (2006)
101 Things Removed from the Human Body (originally broadcast on Sky One; on C4 in 2004)
1066 The Battle for Middle Earth (2009) 
15,000 Kids and Counting (2014)
A Jihad for Love (C4 film; 2007)
Africa (1984)
After Dark (1987-1997)
Airplaneski! (1995)
Alien Investigations (2012)
Alien Worlds (2005)
All in the Best Possible Taste with Grayson Perry (2012)
Alternative Christmas message (1993-)
Americana (1992)
An Impossible Job (part of the Cutting Edge series; 1994)
Anatomy for Beginners (2005) 
Ancient Egyptians (2003-2004)
The Ancient World (2002-2010)
Ark on the Move (Canada import; on C4 1983–)
The Autistic Gardener (2015-2017) 
The Awful Truth (1999-2000)
The Beatles and India (2021; on C4 2022)
Beauty and the Beast: Ugly Face of Prejudice (2011-2012)
The Big Art Project (2009) 
Black on Black (1982-1985)
Blind Young Things (part of the Cutting Edge series; 2007)
Body Shock (2003-2014)
Born Survivor-Bear Grylls (aka Man vs. Wild; 2006-)
Born to Be Different (2003-) 
Brave New World with Stephen Hawking (2011)
Break the Science Barrier (1996)
Britain at Low Tide (2016-2019) 
Britain's Ancient Tracks with Tony Robinson (2016-2017)
Britain's Fattest Man (2011)
Britain's Most Historic Towns (2018-2020) 
Britain's Real Monarch (2004)
Business Daily (1987-1992)
Catastrophe (2008)
Catching a Killer (2017-) 
Channel 4 News (1982-)
Chasing a Rainbow: The Life of Josephine Baker (1986)
Children of 9/11: Our Story (2021)
The Children Who Cheated the Nazis (2000)
The Churchills (2012)
Civilization: Is the West History? (2011)
Close Harmony (US import: on C4 1983) 
Coastal Railways with Julie Walters (2017)
Cutting Edge (1990-)
The Dark Side of Porn (2005-2006)
David Baddiel: Jews Don't Count (2022)
The Day the World Took Off (2000)
Desperately Seeking Something (1995-1998)
Disinformation (2000-2001)
Dispatches (1987)
Driven (1998-2002)
Drugs Live (2012, 2015) 
The Enemies of Reason (2007)
Engineering Announcements (1983-1990)
Equinox (1986-2001)
Eunuchs (2007)
Extinct (2001)
Extreme Male Beauty (2009)
The First 48 (US import)
First Cut (2007-)
The First World War (2003)
The Force (2009)
Fortean TV (1997-1998)
Frontline — America (US import; on C4 1983)
Gadget Man (2012-2015; the first series was titled Stephen Fry: Gadget Man)
Gay Muslims (2006)
Gemma Collins: Self-Harm & Me (2022)
Genius of Britain: The Scientists Who Changed the World (2010)
The Genius of Charles Darwin (2008)
George Clarke's Amazing Spaces (2012-)
Ghislaine Maxwell: The Making of a Monster (2022)
Globe Trekker (formerly known asLonely Planet; 1994–2016)
Gnostics (1987)
Gods in the Sky (2003)
Going to Extremes (2001)
Grayson Perry: All Man (2016)
Great Canal Journeys (2014-2021)
The Great Global Warming Swindle (2007)
The Great Moghuls (1992)
The Greenhouse Conspiracy (part of the Equinox series; 1990)
Harlan County, USA (US import; on C4 1983) 
Heart of the Dragon (1984)
Henry VIII: The Mind of a Tyrant (2009)
History Hunters (1998-1999)
Hitler's British Girl (2007)
Hitler: The Lost Tapes (2022)
Hollywood (originally broadcast on ITV; on C4 1983–)
The Holy Family Album (1991)
Home from Home (2001)
How to Get a Council House (2013-2016)
How Videogames Changed the World (2013)
How We Used to Live (originally broadcast on Yorkshire TV)
The Incredibly Strange Film Show (1988-1989)
Inside Nature's Giants (2009-2012)
Islam: The Untold Story (2012)
Jesus: The Evidence (1984)
Joe Lycett's Got Your Back (2019-)
Joe Lycett vs the Oil Giant (2021)
John Peel's Record Box (2005)
Jon Richardson Grows Up (2014)
Jonathan Ross Presents for One Week Only (1990)
Leaving Neverland (2019)
Make Bradford British (2012) 
Make Me a Tory (2007) 
Man on Earth (2009) 
Michael Moore Live (1999)
Monarchy (2004-2007)
Mondo Macabro (2002)
Munich: Mossad's Revenge (2006)
My Grandparents' War (2019)
My Son the Jihadi (2015)
My Transsexual Summer (2011)
No Fire Zone: In the Killing Fields of Sri Lanka (2013)
Not Forgotten (2005-2009)
One Born Every Minute (2010-2018)
Opinions (1982-1994)
Paul Merton's Secret Stations (2016) 
Paul Robeson: Tribute to an Artist (US import; on C4 1983)
The Perfect Home (2006)
Picasso: Magic, Sex & Death (2001)
The Plane Crash (2012)
Right to Reply (1982-2001)
The Root of All Evil? (aka The God Delusion; 2006)
Saving Africa's Witch Children (part of the Dispatches series; 2008)
Secret History (1991-2004, 2013–2019)
The Secret Life of Machines (1988-1993)
Secrets of the Super Psychics (1997)
Seven Ages of Britain (2003)
Sex, Death and the Meaning of Life (2012)
The Sex Education Show (2008-2011)
The Sinking of the Concordia: Caught on Camera (2012) 
Sir Alex Ferguson: Never Give In (first broadcast on Prime Video; on C4 2022)
The Six Wives of Henry VIII (2001)
Shariah TV (2004-2008)
The Spartans (2002; part of The Ancient World series)
Speed with Guy Martin (2013-)
Spice Girls: How Girl Power Changed Britain (2021)
Spirituality Shopper (2005)
The Spy Machine (1998)
Sri Lanka's Killing Fields (2011)
Sri Lanka's Killing Fields: War Crimes Unpunished (2012)
Station X (1999)
Stephen Hawking: Master of the Universe (2008)
The Stranger on the Bridge (2015)
Surviving Extremes (2003)
Terror at Sea: The Sinking of the Costa Concordia(2012) 
Terror in the Skies (2013)
Time Signs (1991)
Time Team (1994-2014)
Time Team Digs (2002)
Time Team Extra (1998)
Time Team Live (1997-2006) 
Tony Robinson's Crime and Punishment (2008)
Tony Robinson's Romans (2003)
Town Bloody Hall (US import; on C4 1983)
Travel Man (2015-)
Trip Hazard: My Great British Adventure (2021) 
The Trouble with Atheism (2006)
Undercover Mosque (part of the Dispatches series; 2007)
Unreported World (2000-)
Vietnam (1983)
Vietnam: The Ten Thousand Day War (Canada import; on C4 1984–1985)
Walking Through History (2013-2014) 
We Need to Talk about Dad (2011; part of the Cutting Edge series)
Weapons That Made Britain (2004)
Weekend in Wallop (1984)
What the Papers Say (1982-1988)
When Björk Met Attenborough (2013)
When Boris Met Dave (2009; originally broadcast on More4)
When Steptoe Met Son (2002)
When the Moors Ruled in Europe (2005; part of The Ancient World series)
Willie's Wonky Chocolate Factory (2008)
World of Weird (pilot 2015; series 2016)
The Worst Jobs in History (2004-2006) 
The Worst of Hollywood (1983)
Wreck Detectives (2003-2004)
X-Rated: The Pop Videos They Tried to Ban (2004)
X-Rated: The TV They Tried to Ban (2005)
Young, Nazi and Proud (2002)

Reality TV

10 Years Younger (2004-2010)
The 1900 House (1999-2000)
The 1940s House (2001)
24 Hours in A&E (2011-)
24 Hours in Police Custody (2014-)
999: What's Your Emergency? (2012-)
A Granny's Guide to the Modern World (2016)
A Place in the Sun (2000-)
Bake Off: The Professionals (aka Bake Off: The Créme de la Créme; 2016-)
Bald! (2003)
Bank of Dave (2012)
Beauty and the Geek (2006; originally broadcast on E4)
Bedlam (2013)
Bedsitcom (2003)
Benefits Street (2014-2015)
Beyond River Cottage (2004)
Big Ballet (2014)
Big Brother (2000-2010)
Big Brother Panto (2004-2005)
Big Fat Gypsy Weddings (2010-2015)
Billion Dollar Cruise (2020)
Bodyshockers (2014-)
Boiling Point (1999)
Boys and Girls Alone (2009)
Brat Camp (2005-2007)
Brendan's Magical Mystery Tour (2013)
Bringing Up Baby (2007)
Building the Dream (2013-; originally broadcast on More4)
California Dreaming (2005)
Car SOS (originally broadcast on National Geographic; 2013-)
Celebrity Big Brother (2001-2010)
The Celebrity Circle (2021) 
Celebrity Five Go to... (2011-2012)
Celebrity Hunted (2017-)
Celebrity Island with Bear Grylls (2016-2019)
Changing Rooms (2021)
Child Genius (2013-)
The Circle (2018-2021)
The City Gardener (2003-2005)
Coach Trip (2005-)
Coast vs Country (2016-) 
Collector's Lot (1997-2001) 
College Girls (2002)
Colonial House (2004; US/UK co-production)
Come Date with Me (2011-2012) 
Come Dine with Me (2005-)
The Convention Crasher (2007-2008)
Coppers (2010-2012)
Country House Rescue (2008-2012)
Crazy Delicious (2020) 
Crime Team (pilot 2001; series 2002) 
Davina McCall's Language of Love (2022)
Deadliest Catch (US import)
Deadline (1995)
Demoltion (2005)
Dirty Sexy Things (2011)
The Dog House (2019-)
Dolce Vito – Dream Restaurant (2009)
Don't Make Me Angry (2005-2006) 
Dumped (2007)
Eden (2002; set in Australia)
Eden (2016-2017; set in Scotland)
Educating... (2011-2020)
Educating Cardiff (2015)
Educating Essex (2011)
Educating Greater Manchester (2017)
Educating Greater Manchester 2 (2020)
Educating the East End (2014)
Educating Yorkshire (2013-2014)
The Edwardian Country House (2002)
Embarrassing Bodies (2007-2015)
Escape to River Cottage (1999)
Escape to the Chateau (2016-)
Escape to the Chateau DIY (2018-)
Escape to the Wild (originally titled Kevin McCloud's Escape to the Wild; 2015-2017) 
Extreme A&E (2012)
Extreme Celebrity Detox (2005)
Extreme Dreams with Ben Fogle (2006-2009)
The Family (2008-2010)
Faking It (2000-2006)
Fame Asylum (2006) 
Famous and Fearless (2011)
Find Me a Family (2009) 
First Dates (2013-)
For the Love of Cars (2014-2016)
Four in a Bed (aka Three in a Bed; 2010-)
Four Rooms (2011-2019)
The F***ing Fulfords (2004)
The Games (2003-2006)
Get Your Act Together with Harvey Goldsmith (2007)
Gogglebox (2013-)
Gordon Behind Bars (2012)
Grand Designs (1999-)
Grayson's Art Club (2020-2021)
The Great British Bake Off (2017-)
The Great British Bake Off: An Extra Slice (2017-)
The Great British Dig (2020-) 
The Great Pottery Throw Down (2021-)
Help! My House is Falling Down (2010-)
Hidden Talent (2012) 
The Hoarder Next Door (2012-2014)
The Hotel (2011-2015)
Hotel GB (2012)
House Auction (2005-)
House Guest (2008) 
The House of Obsessive Compulsives (2005)
How Clean Is Your House? (2003-2009)
How the Other Half Live (2009-2010)
How to Look Good Naked (2006-2011)
Hugh's Chicken Run (2008)
Hunted (2015-)
Immigration Street (2015)
Indian Summer School (2018) 
The Island with Bear Grylls (2014-2019)
Iron Chef UK (2010)
It's Me or the Dog (2005-2008)
Jamie's American Food Revolution (US import)
Jamie's Dream School (2011)
Jamie's Ministry of Food (2008)
Jo Frost: Extreme Parental Guidance (2010-2012)
The Jump (2014-2017)
Kevin McCloud's Man Made Home (2012-2013)
Kings of Comedy (2004)
Kirstie and Phil's Love It or List It (2015-)
Lego Masters (2017-2018)
Location, Location, Location (2000-)
Lost (2001)
Love Thy Neighbour (2011)
Make Me Prime Minister (2022)
Made in Chelsea (originally broadcast on E4)
Man Vs Weird (2014)
Married at First Sight (2015-)
Masters and Servants (2003)
Miss Naked Beauty (2008)
Model Behaviour (2001-2002)
Musicool (2007)
Obsessive Compulsive Cleaners (2013-2016)
Orchestra United (2010)
The Osbournes (US import)
Our Man in... (2012)
Passengers (1995-)
The People's Parliament (pilot 1993; series 1994–1997)
The People's Supermarket (2011) 
Pet Rescue (1997-2003)
Phil Spencer: Secret Agent (2012-)
Picture This (2001)
Playing it Straight (2005; 2012)
Princess Nikki (originally broadcast on E4; 2006)
Property Ladder (2001-2009)
Ramsay's 24 Hours to Hell and Back (US import)
Ramsay's Best Restaurant (2010)
Ramsay's Hotel Hell (US import)
Ramsay's Kitchen Nightmares (2004-2014)
Ramsay's Kitchen Nightmares USA (US import)
The Real Housewives of New Jersey (US import)
Regency House Party (2004)
The Restoration Man (2010-)
River Cottage Forever (2002)
River Cottage Spring (2008)
Return to River Cottage (2000)
Relocation Relocation (2004-2011)
The Salon (2003-2004)
Sarah Beeny's New Life in the Country (2020-) 
SAS: Who Dares Wins (2015-) 
Secret Eaters (2012-2014) 
The Secret Life of the Zoo (2016-)
The Secret Millionaire (2006-2012) 
Secret Removers (2012)
Seven Dwarves (2011)
Sex Box (2013-2016)
The Sex Inspectors (2004-2007)
Shipwrecked (1999-2001, 2006–2009) 
Skint (2013-2015)
The Simple Life (US import)
Space Cadets (2005)
Steph and Dom's One Star to Five Star (2017)
Streetmate (1998-2001, 2017)
The Supervet: Noel Fitzpatrick (2014-)
Supernanny (2004-2008)
Supersize vs Superskinny (2008-2014)
The Taste (2014)
Teen Big Brother: The Experiment (2003)
That'll Teach 'Em (2003-2006)
Time Crashers (2015)
Tower Block of Commons (2010)
The Tribe (2015)
Ultimate Big Brother (2010)
The Undateables (2012-)
Undercover Boss (2009-2014)
Undercover Boss Canada (Canada import)
Undercover Boss USA (US import)
Wakey Wakey Campers (2005)
What the Butler Saw (2004) 
Wife Swap (2003-2009; 2017 special)
Yeardot (2008-2009)
You Are What You Eat (2004-2007)

Soaps
Brookside (1982-2003)
Damon and Debbie (1987)
Family Pride (1991-1992) 
Hollyoaks (1995-)
Springhill (1996-1997)

Sport

2012 Summer Paralympics
2014 Winter Paralympics
2016 Summer Paralympics
2017 BDO World Darts Championship
2017 World Para Athletics Championship
2018 Winter Paralympics
2020 Summer Paralympics
Channel 4 F1 (2016-) 
Channel 4 Racing (1984-2016)
England cricket tour of India in 2020–21
European Poker Tour
The Fanbanta Football Show (2007) 
Football Italia (1992-2002)
Formula E (2022-)
Formula E Unplugged (2023-)
Late Night Poker (1999-2002, 2008–2011)
Mobil 1 The Grid (2009-)
The Morning Line (1984-2016)
Tour de France
TCR UK (2022-)
Trans World Sport (1987-)
Under the Moon (1996)
WWE Heat (US import)

Misc
3 Minute Wonder (2006)
4Learning
4thought.tv (2010-)
Adult at 14 season (2003)
Channel 4 Banned season (1991; 2004–2005)
Club X (arts programme; 1989)
Crufts (international dog show; 2010-)
extra (2002-2004; educational sitcom)
National Comedy Awards (2011-2014, 2022-)
Red triangle (1986-1987)
Stand Up to Cancer (charitable telethon; 2012-)
T4 (1998-2012)
The Trip (1999)
TV Heaven (1992)

Notes
 Shows with "import" beside the name have not been directly commissioned by Channel 4 and have been imported from broadcasters in countries outside the United Kingdom.

References